A Fires Brigade (FiB) was a field artillery and rocket formation of the United States Army. With recent structural changes, Fires Brigades were either inactivated and reflagged as Division Artilleries (DIVARTY) or reorganized and redesignated as Field Artillery Brigades. Fires Brigades included:

Active duty artillery brigades:
 17th Field Artillery Brigade, artillery brigade of I Corps (was a Fires Brigade between 17 July 2007 and 19 February 2014)
 18th Field Artillery Brigade, artillery brigade of XVIII Airborne Corps
 41st Field Artillery Brigade, artillery brigade of United States Army Europe and Africa
 75th Field Artillery Brigade, artillery brigade of III Corps
 210th Field Artillery Brigade, artillery brigade of Eighth United States Army

National Guard artillery brigades:
 45th Fires Brigade (Oklahoma ARNG)
 65th Fires Brigade (Utah ARNG)
 115th Fires Brigade (Wyoming ARNG)
 130th Fires Brigade (Kansas ARNG)
 138th Fires Brigade (KY ARNG)
 142nd Fires Brigade (AR ARNG)
 169th Fires Brigade (CO ARNG)
 197th Fires Brigade (NH ARNG)

Former artillery brigades:
 42nd Fires Brigade, reflagged to 3rd Infantry Division Artillery
 212th Fires Brigade, reflagged to 1st Armored Division Artillery
 214th Fires Brigade, reflagged to 4th Infantry Division Artillery

References

See also

 Reorganization plan of United States Army